Rhododendron keiskei is a species of flowering plant in the heath family Ericaceae, native to Honshu, Kyushu and Shikoku in Japan.

The leaves are elliptic in shape, and the pale yellow flowers, each with ten prominent stamens, are abundantly produced in spring.

The specific epithet keiskei honours the Japanese botanist Keisuke Ito (1803–1901).

Varieties
Two varieties are recorded:
 R. keiskei var. keiskei – does not tolerate freezing temperatures
 R. keiskei var. ozawae – prostrate shrub growing to only , but hardy to -10° F, and leaves shorter

Cultivation
The slow-growing cultivar R. keiskei  var. ozawae ‘Yaku Fairy' has gained the Royal Horticultural Society’s Award of Garden Merit. 

This plant is best cultivated in a sheltered spot with moist acidic soil, in a partially shaded woodland setting.

References

keiskei
Flora of Japan
Plants described in 1971